Dawid Florian (born 26 December 1982 in Jaworzno) is a Polish professional footballer who plays as a midfielder for Polish side Czarni 1910 Jasło.

External links
 Znicz Pruszków 

1982 births
Living people
Polish footballers
Lech Poznań players
Znicz Pruszków players
Sandecja Nowy Sącz players
Ekstraklasa players
I liga players
II liga players
III liga players
People from Jaworzno
Sportspeople from Silesian Voivodeship
Association football midfielders